Maiden Voyage is the debut album by Swedish electronic band Alice in Videoland, released in Sweden on 19 November 2003 by National Records. In the United States and Canada, the album was released in 2007 by Artoffact Records under the title Maiden Voyage Plus, containing remixes and B-sides as bonus tracks.

Track listing
All songs written and composed by Toril Lindqvist and Calle Lundgren.

"Lay Me Down" – 3:03
"Got to Go" – 3:27
"Going Down" – 3:18
"Red" – 3:03
"Dance with Me" – 2:29
"Video Girl" – 2:55
"Panic" – 4:54
"Addicted" – 2:35
"Naked" – 2:27
"Sweet Thing" – 3:46

Maiden Voyage Plus bonus tracks
"Going Down" (Gabi Delgado RMX) – 5:21
"Player" – 2:33
"The Bomb" – 2:26
"The Bomb" (Body Version) – 3:29
"Lay Me Down" (Remix) – 3:57

Personnel
 Anders Alexander – producer, mixing
 Henrik Jonsson – mastering
 Toril Lindqvist – music
 Calle Lundgren – producer, music, artwork
 Michael Lohse – guitar, organ, additional vocals

Release history

References

2003 debut albums
Alice in Videoland albums